Joey Faye (born Joseph Antony Palladino, July 12, 1909 or 1910 or 1902– April 26, 1997) was an American comedian and actor.

Born in New York City, he gained fame as a comic in vaudeville and claimed that he created two of vaudeville's more renowned pieces of business, "Floogle Street" (a.k.a. "Susquehana Hat Company") and "Slowly I Turned". In addition to an active career in vaudeville and the legitimate theater, he appeared in many movies and TV shows.

Broadway
The Republic Theatre was the site of Faye's New York stage debut at age 21. During World War II, he entertained Allied military personnel in Africa and Europe as part of a troupe headed by Marlene Dietrich.

Faye played second banana to Phil Silvers in two Broadway shows, High Button Shoes and Top Banana. He also appeared in the 1954 film. In a Broadway career that stretched between the late 1930s and the early 1990s, he appeared in 17 shows altogether, including Room Service (his Broadway debut) and The Tender Trap. He also appeared in the 1955 movie adaptation), the 1965 revival of Guys and Dolls, and Neil Simon's musical Little Me. Faye was the green grapes Fruit of the Loom commercials throughout the 1980s.

He appeared as a guest in many TV shows from 1949 through 1984 and a series of short subject films, including Mack & Myer for Hire (1963), about two bumbling plumbers, who rode around in a motorcycle with a sidecar, attempting repairs, but producing chaos.

Personal life
Faye was married three times—to Eileen Jenkins, Ginna Carr, and Judy Carlin. He once lived in Great Kills, Staten Island.

Death
Faye died of a heart attack in Englewood, New Jersey, on April 26, 1997. He was 87 years old.

Filmography

Film
Close-Up (1948) - Roger
Let's Do It Again (1953) - Party Guest (uncredited)
Top Banana (1954) - Pinky
The Tender Trap (1955) - Sol Z. Steiner
Street of Sinners (1957) - Pete
Hear Me Good (1957) - Charlie Cooper
Sing, Boy, Sing (1958) - Mr. Baron (uncredited)
Ten North Frederick (1958) - Taxi Driver (uncredited)
The 30 Foot Bride of Candy Rock (1959) - Booster (uncredited)
North to Alaska (1960) - Miner / Artist (uncredited)
The Wizard of Baghdad (1960) - Coutiere (uncredited)
That Touch of Mink (1962) - Short Man
For Love or Money (1963) - Bread Shopper on 16mm Film
Diary of a Bachelor (1964) - Bachelor
Dead Heat on a Merry-Go-Round (1966) - Joe (uncredited)
Penelope (1966) - Spectator (uncredited)
How to Succeed in Business Without Really Trying (1967) - Taxi Driver (uncredited)
The Night They Raided Minsky's (1967) - Professor Spats (body double for the deceased Bert Lahr in select scenes, uncredited)
No Way to Treat a Lady (1968) - Caretaker (uncredited)
What's So Bad About Feeling Good? (1968) - Zookeeper (uncredited)
The Grissom Gang (1971) - Woppy
The War Between Men and Women (1972) - Delivery Boy
The Front (1976) - Waiter
Once Upon a Time in America (1984) - Adorable Old Man (final film role)

Television
Straightaway (1961, episode "The Bribe") - Kinette
Late Night with David Letterman (1991) - Charles Grodin's attorney

References

External links

Susquehanna Hat Co. from YouTube

20th-century births
1997 deaths

Year of birth uncertain
Male actors from New York City
American people of Italian descent
Vaudeville performers
20th-century American male actors
People from Great Kills, Staten Island
American male comedians
[[Category:Comedians from New York (state)